{{DISPLAYTITLE:C26H26N2}}
The molecular formula C26H26N2 (molar mass: 366.49 g/mol) may refer to:

 Azipramine, a tetracyclic antidepressant
 Yuehchukene, a dimeric indole alkaloid

Molecular formulas